4-Pyridone is an organic compound with the formula .  It is a colorless solid.  The compound exists in equilibrium with a minor tautomer, pyridin-4-ol.

Preparation
4-Pyridone, and its derivatives, are prepared from 4-Pyrone and amines in protic solvents.

See also
 4-Piperidone
 Dehydroacetic acid

References